Hey! Bob! My Friend! is the debut US release for the Japanese synth-rock band Polysics.

The album consists of various tracks from the band's earlier Japanese-only releases 1st P and A.D.S.R.M!.

Track listing

 "Sunnymaster"
 "Buggie Technica"
 "Plus Chicker (981018 mix)"
 "Hot Stuff"
 "Married to a Frenchman"
 "Eleki Gassen"
 "Nice"
 "Good"
 "Monsoon"
 "Pike"
 "Poly-Farm"
 "Modern"

References

2001 albums
Asian Man Records albums